Félix Palomo Saavedra (15 March 1937 − 7 October 2021) was a Spanish politician. A member of the Spanish Socialist Workers' Party, he served in the Senate of Spain from 1977 to 1982 and was President of the Parliament of La Rioja from 1983 to 1987 and again from 1988 to 1995.

References

1937 births
2021 deaths
Spanish Socialist Workers' Party politicians
Members of the 1st Senate of Spain
Members of the 1st Parliament of La Rioja (Spain)
Members of the 2nd Parliament of La Rioja (Spain)
Members of the 3rd Parliament of La Rioja (Spain)
Presidents of the Parliament of La Rioja (Spain)
People from the Province of Badajoz